Shahid Kamju (also Romanized as Shahīd Kāmjū; also known as Shahīd Nāmjū) is a village in Tabadkan Rural District, in the Central District of Mashhad County, Razavi Khorasan Province, Iran. At the 2006 census, its population was 430, in 112 families.

References 

Populated places in Mashhad County